Louise Braverman is a New York City-based architect known for a design philosophy that aims to combine aesthetic design and social conscience. She is a Fellow of the American Institute of Architects (FAIA).

Educated at the Yale School of Architecture, Braverman founded her own firm, Louise Braverman Architect, in 1991. Her firm has designed a number of notable buildings around the world including the Village Health Works Staff Housing in Burundi and Centro de Artes Nadir Afonso in Portugal. Centro de Artes Nadir Afonso, an art museum, has been featured in the pivotal books, Destination Architecture: The Essential Guide to 1000 Contemporary Buildings and  Breaking Ground: Architecture by Women, a visual survey of architecture designed by women from the early twentieth century to the present day. Braverman lectures frequently, discussing her work at such venues as Columbia GSAPP, The Plan Magazine Perspective USA, and at the Architectural League NY as an Emerging Voice. She described her architectural design approach in her keynote address at the 2017 AIA Iowa Convention  and again in her 2020 in-depth interview with Julia Gamolina published on the noted website, MadameArchitect.org. Recently Braverman was invited to present the work of her firm at the 2016, 2014, and 2012 Venice Biennale of Architecture, as well as at the Time Space Existence exhibit at the 2021 and 2018 Venice Architecture Biennales. She discussed her thoughts about how her five consecutive installations at Venice added insight to the evolution of her built architectural work in conversation with Martha Thorne at the AIA New York Chapter Cocktails and Conversation program. She also expressed how Venice is a source of her creative inspiration in her essay Dream of Venice Architecture.

Notable Works

Some of Braverman's notable works include award-winning sustainable housing center for health workers in a rural village in Burundi, Africa and the Centro de Artes Nadir Afonso Art Museum in Boticas, Portugal dedicated to the work of abstract artist Nadir Afonso.

Other projects that have gained attention from the media include CV Starr Hand Surgery Center in St. Luke's Roosevelt Hospital in New York City, Poets House, Derfner Judaica Museum, and Chelsea Court affordable housing. Her firm was selected by the Walton Family Foundation in 2015 to be included in the inaugural Northwest Design Excellence Program, a pool of 36 designers who will contribute to the future of the urban landscape in Northwest Arkansas.

Selected Projects
Architecture
 Pre-Fab Learning Landscape, 2016
 Centro de Artes Nadir Afonso Art Museum, 2013
 Village Health Works Staff Housing, 2013
 Derfner Judaica Museum, 2009
 Poets House Library + Learning Center, 2009 
 Brooklyn Public Library, Highlawn Branch, 2006
 Pavel Zoubok Art Gallery, 2004
 Joe's Salon, 2003
 Chelsea Court Affordable Housing, 2003
 Maps + Movies at Grand Central Terminal, 1996-1997
 Poetic Light at Grand Central Terminal, 1996
Videos
 "Hyperloop Suburb - Louise Braverman Architect", Time Space Existence Exhibit during the Venice Architecture Biennale, 2018
 "Active Voice", Venice Architecture Biennale Installation, 2016
 "Voices from Venice: Conversations at the 2014 Architecture Biennale with Women Who Practice Architecture", 2014 
 "Kigutu in Formation", Venice Architecture Biennale Installation, 2012

Awards
   
2021
 Interior Design Best of Design Finalist
 Interior Design Best In Design Centro de Artes Nadir Afonso
"Time Space Existence" Exhibitor at the 17th Venice Architecture Biennale
2020
 Interior Design Women in Design Award
2019
 Chicago Athenaeum International Architecture Award
 Chicago Athenaeum Green GOOD DESIGN Award
2018
 "Time Space Existence" Exhibitor at the 16th Venice Architecture Biennale
 Infinite Archive at New York Public Library Art Exhibition, 1 of 30 Selected Artists
 Frame Awards People's Choice Winner
2017
 NYCxDESIGN Award Honoree 
 Architizer A+ Special Mention Award
 Chicago Athenaeum Green GOOD DESIGN Award
2016
 DAF 2016 Awards Second Award
 AIA Small Projects Awards
 The 15th Venice Architecture Biennale
2015
 Blueprint Awards Shortlist
 Architizer A+ Award Finalist
 ArchDaily Building of the Year Award Finalist
 AIA NY Chapter Design Award of Merit
2014
 Architect Magazine Annual Design Review Citation Award
 Architect Magazine Annual Design Review Honorable Mention Award
 The 14th Venice Architecture Biennale
 Re-Thinking the Future Sustainability Honorable Mention Award
 Chicago Athenaeum American Architecture Award
 AIANY State Award of Excellence
 AIANY State Award of Merit
 AIANY Chapter/Boston Society of Architects Housing Design Award
 Architizer A+ Special Mention Award
2013
 Chicago Athenaeum International Architecture Award
 Chicago Athenaeum GREEN GOOD DESIGN Award

2012
 The 13th Venice Architecture Biennale
 Chicago Athenaeum American Architecture Award
2010
 Chicago Athenaeum Green GOOD DESIGN Award
2009
 Chicago Athenaeum International Architecture Award
2008
 Elevated to Fellowship in the American Institute of Architects
2005
 Residential Architect Design Award of Merit
2004
 AIA NY Chapter/Boston Society of Architects Housing Design Award
 AIA National Housing Award
1997
 I.D. Annual Design Review Best of Category Award
1996
 The Architectural League Emerging Voices Award
1994
 AIA Long Island Chapter ARCHI Award

References

External links
 Louise Braverman Architect official website

Year of birth missing (living people)
Living people
Architects from New York City
Yale School of Architecture alumni
Fellows of the American Institute of Architects
American women architects
21st-century American architects
21st-century American women artists